Sokol Kushta (born 17 April 1964) is an Albanian retired football player, who was arguably one of his country's best players in the second half of the 1980s and the beginning of the 1990s and one of the first to be allowed by the communist party to play abroad.

Kushta was a striker and was ranked 30th in the 1987 European Footballer of the Year, matching in the ranking players such as Alessandro Altobelli, Glenn Hoddle, and Rudi Völler.

Club career
Born in Vlorë, Kushta spent the large part of his Albanian league career with hometown club Flamurtari during the 1980s, the club's golden years alongside fellow international players like Alfred Zijai, Kreshnik Çipi, Petro Ruçi, Alfred Ferko and Rrapo Taho. In the 1987–88 season, he and his Flamurtari teammates managed to knock out Partizan Belgrade and Wismut Aue, before losing for a second successive year to Spanish giants FC Barcelona in the round of 16 in the UEFA Cup. He also had three seasons with army club Partizani Tirana.

One of the most high-profile Albanian players at the time, Kushta moved abroad following the fall of communism and joined Greek side Iraklis Saloniki alongside fellow international and Flamurtari goalkeeper Anesti Arapi and later played for Apollon Kalamarias and in Cyprus for Ethnikos Achnas and Olympiakos Nicosia.

Kushta is the current joint-top goalscorer of Albanian Supercup along with KF Tirana's Mahir Halili, having scored a hat-trick in the 1990 edition against Dinamo Tirana.

International career
Kushta made his debut for Albania in a March 1987 European Championship qualification match away at Romania and earned a total of 31 caps, scoring a then national record 10 goals. His final international was an October 1996 FIFA World Cup qualification match against Portugal.

Honours
Partizani
Albanian Superliga: 1986–87
Flamurtari
Albanian Superliga: 1990–91

References

External links
 

1964 births
Living people
Footballers from Vlorë
Albanian footballers
Association football forwards
Albania international footballers
Flamurtari Vlorë players
FK Partizani Tirana players
Albanian expatriate footballers
Expatriate footballers in Greece
Iraklis Thessaloniki F.C. players
Athinaikos F.C. players
Albanian expatriate sportspeople in Greece
Expatriate footballers in Cyprus
Apollon Pontou FC players
Albanian expatriate sportspeople in Cyprus
Olympiakos Nicosia players
Ethnikos Achna FC players
Super League Greece players
Cypriot First Division players
Albanian football managers
Flamurtari Vlorë managers